Sun Gang is a Chinese wheelchair fencer. He represented China at the 2016 Summer Paralympics and in total he won two gold medals, one silver medal and one bronze medal. He also won two gold medals in the men's foil A event, men's team foil and the silver medal in the men's épée team at the 2020 Summer Paralympics held in Tokyo, Japan.

References

External links 
 

Living people
Year of birth missing (living people)
Place of birth missing (living people)
Chinese male épée fencers
Wheelchair fencers at the 2016 Summer Paralympics
Wheelchair fencers at the 2020 Summer Paralympics
Medalists at the 2016 Summer Paralympics
Medalists at the 2020 Summer Paralympics
Paralympic gold medalists for China
Paralympic silver medalists for China
Paralympic bronze medalists for China
Paralympic medalists in wheelchair fencing
Paralympic wheelchair fencers of China
Chinese male foil fencers
Chinese male sabre fencers
21st-century Chinese people